María Eugenia del Valle de Siles (1928 – 17 January 1994) was a Chilean-Bolivian historian, researcher, and university professor.

Biography
María Eugenia del Valle was born in Santiago in 1928. She earned a licentiate as a historian from the University of Chile. With the aid of a scholarship, she completed her doctoral studies at the Central University of Madrid. In 1957, she married the Bolivian essayist and diplomat , whom she met in Madrid, and they moved to Bolivia in the mid-1960s. She taught History of America and Universal History at the University of Valparaíso, and in 1966 she became Professor of History of America and Modern Universal History at the Higher University of San Andrés in La Paz.

She was the sister of Chilean Foreign Minister , and the mother of Juan Ignacio Siles del Valle, Foreign Minister of Bolivia from 2003 to 2005.

María Eugenia del Valle died in La Paz, where she had established her residence, on 17 January 1994.

Awards and recognitions
 1991: Made a member of the Bolivian Academy of History
 1993: Order of the Condor of the Andes from the government of Bolivia
 1993: Culture Award from the Manuel Vicente Ballivián Foundation

Work

Her work as a researcher and historian focused on the issue of the indigenous rebellions of the 18th century by consulting the archives of Bolivia, Buenos Aires, Madrid, and Seville. Her publications include:

 Testimonio del cerco de La Paz (1980)
 Diario del alzamiento de indios conjurados contra la ciudad de Nuestra Señora de La Paz, 1781 (1981)
 Bartolina Sisa, Gregoria Apaza. Dos heroínas indígenas (1981), Biblioteca Popular Boliviana de Ultima Hora
 Historia de la Rebelión de Tupaj Katari 1781–1782 (1990)

It was presented on 29 November 2017 through a civic event that recreated the caravan of Túpac Katari and Bartolina Sisa.

References

1928 births
1994 deaths
20th-century Bolivian women writers
20th-century Bolivian historians
Chilean expatriates in Bolivia
Complutense University of Madrid alumni
University of Chile alumni
Academic staff of the University of Valparaíso
Chilean women historians
Women historians
Writers from Santiago
20th-century Chilean historians